Eremophila succinea is a flowering plant in the figwort family, Scrophulariaceae and is endemic to Western Australia. It is an erect, broom-shaped shrub with sticky, narrow, hooked leaves, narrow, sticky sepals and hairy, pale purple or mauve petals.

Description
Its branches are yellowy-brown and have irregular, raised, warty lumps of amber-coloured resin. They are glabrous, have tiny wrinkles, small raised glands, are sticky and often have a few raised warty lumps of resin in the lower part of the leaf bases.

The petal tube is pale purple to mauve on the outside and white inside with faint purple spots. The petal tube and especially the lobes are hairy on the outside, while the inside of the tube and the inside of the lower petal lobe are also very hairy. The 4 stamens are fully enclosed in the petal tube.

Taxonomy and naming 
This species was first formally described by Robert Chinnock in 2007 and the description was published in Eremophila and Allied Genera: A Monograph of the Plant Family Myoporaceae. The specific epithet (succinea) is a Latin word meaning 'amber-coloured', referring to the colour of the resin on the branches of this species.

Distribution and habitat
Eremophila succinea grows in sandy clay soil in scattered locations between Norseman, Peak Charles and Lake King in the Coolgardie and Mallee biogeographic regions.

Conservation
This eremophila is classified as "Priority Three" by the Western Australian Government Department of Parks and Wildlife meaning that it is poorly known and known from only a few locations but is not under imminent threat.

Use in horticulture
This erect, broom-shaped, wispy shrub is ideal for filling narrow spots in the garden.  It is a hardy shrub often bearing masses of attractive blue flowers. Propagation from cuttings is difficult but it is relatively easy to graft onto Myoporum rootstock. Well-drained soil in full sun or part shade is preferred but mature shrubs are very drought and frost tolerant.

References

succinea
Eudicots of Western Australia
Endemic flora of Western Australia
Plants described in 2007
Taxa named by Robert Chinnock